Public Prosecution Service may refer to:

Organisations
 Public Prosecution Service for Northern Ireland
 Public Prosecution Service of Canada
 Public Prosecution Service (Indonesia)
 Public Prosecution Service (Netherlands)
 Public Prosecution Service (Portugal)

Cases
 Public Prosecution Service of Northern Ireland v. Liam Adams
 The Public Prosecution Service v William Elliott, Robert McKee

See also
 Prosecutor